"How Far" is a song written by Ed Hill, Jamie O'Neal, and Shaye Smith and recorded by American country music singer Martina McBride. It was released in May 2004 as the third single from McBride's 2003 album Martina.

Content
The protagonist has reached a breaking point with her partner's apathy towards their relationship. She has decided to walk away and asks him how far does she have to go to make him realize what is about to happen.

Music video
The music video was directed by Trey Fanjoy and premiered in mid-2004. It was nominated for Female Video of the Year at the 2005 CMT Music Awards.

Chart performance
"How Far" debuted at number 54 on the U.S. Billboard Hot Country Songs chart for the week of April 17, 2004.

Year-end charts

References

2003 songs
Martina McBride songs
Songs written by Ed Hill
Songs written by Jamie O'Neal
Songs written by Shaye Smith
Song recordings produced by Paul Worley
2004 singles
RCA Records Nashville singles
Music videos directed by Trey Fanjoy
2000s ballads
Country ballads